Leonid Berlyand is a Soviet and American mathematician, a professor of Penn State University. He is known for his works on homogenization, Ginzburg–Landau theory, mathematical modeling of active matter and deep learning.

Life and career 
Berlyand was born in Kharkov on September 20, 1957. His father, Viktor Berlyand, was a mechanical engineer, and his mother, Mayya Genkina, an electronics engineer. Upon his graduation in 1979 from the department of mathematics and mechanics at the National University of Kharkov, he began his doctoral studies at the same university and earned a Ph. D. in 1984. His Ph. D. thesis studied the homogenization of elasticity problems. He worked at the Semenov Institute of Chemical Physics in Moscow. In 1991 he moved to the United States and started working at Pennsylvania State University, where he has served as a full professor since 2003. He has held long-term visiting positions at Princeton University, the California Institute of Technology, the University of Chicago, the Max Planck Institute for Mathematics in the Sciences, Argonne and Los Alamos National Laboratories. His research has drawn support from the  National Science Foundation(NSF), NIH/NIGMS, the Applied Mathematics Program of the DOE Office of Sciences, BSF (the Bi-National Science Foundation USA-Israel) and the NATO Science for Peace and Security Section. Berlyand has authored roughly 100 works on homogenization theory and PDE/variational problems in biology and material science. He has organized a number of professional conferences and serves as a co-director of the Center for Mathematics of Living and Mimetic Matter at Penn State University. He has supervised 17 graduate students and ten postdoctoral fellows.

Research
Drawing upon fundamental works in classical homogenization theory, Berlyand advanced the methods of homogenization in many versatile applications. He obtained mathematical results applicable to diverse scientific areas including biology, fluid mechanics, superconductivity, elasticity, and material science. His mathematical modeling explains striking experimental result in the collective swimming of bacteria. His homogenization approach to multi-scale problems was  transformed into a practical computational tool by introducing a concept of polyharmonic homogenization which led to a new type of multiscale finite elements. Together with H. Owhadi, he introduced a "transfer-of-approximation" modeling concept, based on the similarity of the asymptotic behavior of the errors of Galerkin solutions for two elliptic PDEs.  He also contributed to mathematical  aspects of the Ginzburg–Landau theory of superconductivity/superfluidity by introducing a new class of semi-stiff boundary problems.

Awards and honors
 C. I. Noll Award for Excellence in Teaching, Penn State University (2004).
 Honorary professor of the Moscow State University "for his important contribution to Applied Mathematics and Mathematical Physics" (2017)
 Humboldt Prize (2021)

Membership in professional associations
 Society for Industrial and Applied Mathematics (since 1993)
 Society for Mathematical Biology (since 2012)

Editorship
 Managing Editor of Networks and Heterogeneous Media
 Associate Editor of  SIAM/ASA Journal on Uncertainty Quantification (2013–2016)
 Member of Editorial board of International Journal for Multiscale Computational Engineering

Books (author) 
 "Introduction to Network Approximation for Materials Modeling" (with A. Kolpakov and A. Novikov), Cambridge University Press, 2012.
 "Getting Acquainted with Homogenization and Multiscale" (with V. Rybalko), part of the Compact Textbooks in Mathematics book series, Springer, 2018.

Selected publications 
 "Stability in the Training of Deep Neural Networks and Other Classifiers" (with P.-E. Jabin and C. A. Safsten), Mathematical Models and Methods in Applied Sciences (M3AS)}, v. 31(11), pp. 2345-2390 (2021) 
 "Phase-Field Model of Cell Motility: Traveling Waves and Sharp Interface Limit" (with M. Potomkin and V. Rybalko), Comptes Rendus Mathématique, 354(10), pp. 986–992 (2016) 
 "Rayleigh Approximation for ground states of the Bose and Coulomb glasses" (with S. D. Ryan, V. Mityushev, and V. M. Vinokur), Scientific Reports: Nature Publishing Group, 5, 7821 (2015)  
 "Flexibility of bacterial flagella in external shear results in complex swimming trajectories" (with M. Tournus, A. Kirshtein, and I. Aranson), Journal of the Royal Society Interface 12 (102) (2014) 
 "Vortex phase separation in mesoscopic superconductors" (with O. Iaroshenko, V. Rybalko, V. M. Vinokur), Scientific Reports: Nature Publishing Group 3 (2013) 
 "Effective viscosity of bacterial suspensions: A three-dimensional PDE model with stochastic torque" (with B.M. Haines, I.S. Aranson, D.A. Karpeev),  Comm. Pure Appl. Anal., v. 11(1), pp. 19–46 (2012) 
 "Flux norm approach to finite dimensional homogenization approximations with non-separated scales and high contrast" (with H. Owhadi), Arch. Rat. Mech. Anal. , v. 198, n. 2, pp. 677–721 (2010) 
 "Solutions with Vortices of a Semi-Stiff Boundary Value Problem for the Ginzburg-Landau Equation" (with V. Rybalko), J. European Math. Society v. 12 n. 6, pp. 1497–1531 (2009) 
 "Fictitious Fluid Approach and Anomalous Blow-up of the Dissipation Rate in a 2D Model of Concentrated Suspensions" (with Y. Gorb and A. Novikov), Arch. Rat. Mech. Anal., v. 193, n. 3, pp. 585–622, (2009), DOI:10.1007/s00205-008-0152-2 
 "Effective Viscosity of Dilute Bacterial Suspensions: A Two-Dimensional Model" (with B. Haines, I. Aronson, and D. Karpeev), Physical Biology, 5:4, 046003 (9pp) (2008) 
 "Ginzburg-Landau minimizers with prescribed degrees. Capacity of the domain and emergence of vortices" (with P. Mironescu), Journal of Functional Analysis, v. 239, n. 1, pp. 76–99 (2006) 
 "Network Approximation in the Limit of Small Interparticle Distance of the Effective Properties of a High-Contrast Random Dispersed Composite" (with A. Kolpakov), Archive for Rational Mechanics and Analysis, 159, pp. 179–227 (2001) 
 "Non-Gaussian Limiting Behavior of the Percolation Threshold in a Large System" (with J.Wehr), Communications in Mathematical Physics, 185, 73–92 (1997), pdf.
 "Large Time Asymptotics of Solutions to a Model Combustion System with Critical Nonlinearity" (with J. Xin), Nonlinearity, 8:161–178 (1995) 
 "Asymptotics of the Homogenized Moduli for the Elastic Chess-Board Composite" (with S. Kozlov), Archive for Rational Mechanics and Analysis, 118, 95–112 (1992)

References

External links
 Berlyand's page at the site of the Penn State University
 Press release of Berlyand's research on Coulomb glasses
 A conference in honor of Leonid Berlyand's 60th birthday

1957 births
Living people
American mathematicians
Mathematicians from Pennsylvania
Soviet mathematicians
PDE theorists
Mathematical physicists
National University of Kharkiv alumni
Pennsylvania State University faculty
People from State College, Pennsylvania
Humboldt Research Award recipients